This page documents all tornadoes confirmed by various weather forecast offices of the National Weather Service in the United States from November to December 2022. Tornado counts are considered preliminary until final publication in the database of the National Centers for Environmental Information.

United States yearly total

November

November 4 event

November 5 event

November 8 event

November 11 event

November 26 event

November 29 event

November 30 event

December

December 12 event

December 13 event

December 14 event

December 15 event

December 29 event

December 30 event

See also
 Tornadoes of 2022
 List of United States tornadoes from July to October 2022
 List of United States tornadoes in January 2023

Notes

References

2022-related lists
Tornadoes of 2022
2022 natural disasters in the United States
Tornadoes in the United States